Hongji Commercial Center 1 is a skyscraper in Tianjin, China. The 52 story building was completed in 1999.

See also
Skyscraper design and construction
List of tallest buildings in China

References

Buildings and structures in Tianjin
Commercial buildings completed in 1999
1999 establishments in China